Highland Springs High School is a public high school located in the East End of Henrico County, Virginia. It was one of the first high schools established in the Greater Richmond Region.

Replacement school 

After 70 years in its Oak Avenue facility, a new Highland Springs High School building opened for the 2021-22 school year. The new building replaced the original high school building with one built nearby. The project was part of a two-school replacement initiative by Henrico County Public Schools, which also opened a new J.R. Tucker High School for 2021-22. The two new schools cost about $100 million each. Both new schools were built on the football fields adjacent to their old buildings, and new football fields were constructed. 

The old Highland Springs High School building — built in 1952 and renovated in 2008 — is being repurposed as the Oak Avenue Complex. "The Oak" will be HCPS' first full-service community school hub, part of a strategy to connect students and families with community services. It will add dedicated areas for a variety of academic and after-school programs and create a one-stop shop where students and families can connect with groups providing services they need.

Notable alumni
Jamar Abrams — professional basketball player.
Mekhi Becton — offensive tackle for the New York Jets.
Marcus Burley — former cornerback for 7 National Football League teams.
Ron Burton — former linebacker for the Dallas Cowboys, Phoenix Cardinals, and Los Angeles Raiders. He is currently the defensive tackles coach for Michigan State University
Jim Davis- former defensive end in the National Football League and Canadian Football League
Greg Dortch — wide receiver for the Atlanta Falcons.
Victor Harris — former safety in the National Football League and Canadian Football League.
Waddey Harvey — former defensive tackle for the Buffalo Bills.
Thomas Haskins — former running back for the Montreal Alouettes and Edmonton Eskimos. 
Andre Ingram — former guard for the Los Angeles Lakers.
Emanuel McNeil — former nose tackle in the National Football League and Canadian Football League.
Ed Perry — former tight end and long snapper for the Miami Dolphins and Kansas City Chiefs.
Brandon Rozzell — professional basketball player for BC Luleå. Played in college for the Virginia Commonwealth University Rams.
Ricky Stokes — former men's basketball coach at Virginia Tech and East Carolina, currently associate commissioner of the Mid-American Conference.
Jay Threatt — professional basketball player for Stal Ostrów Wielkopolski. Played in college for the Delaware State Hornets.
K'Von Wallace — safety for the Philadelphia Eagles.
Brian Washington — former safety for three National Football League teams.

References

Public high schools in Virginia
Schools in Henrico County, Virginia
Educational institutions established in 1907
1907 establishments in Virginia